Among Eastern Orthodox and Eastern-Rite Catholic Christians, holy water is blessed in the church and given to the faithful to drink at home when needed and to bless their homes. In the weeks following the Feast of Epiphany, clergy visit the homes of parishioners and conduct a service of blessing using the holy water that was blessed on the Feast of Theophany. For  baptism, the water is  sanctified with a special blessing.

Throughout the centuries, there have been many springs of water that have been believed by members of the Orthodox Church to be miraculous. Some still flow to this day, such as the one at Pochaev Lavra in Ukraine, and the Life-Giving Spring of the Theotokos in Constantinople (commemorated annually with the blessing of holy water on Bright Friday).

Although Eastern Orthodox do not normally bless themselves with holy water upon entering a church like Catholics do, a quantity of holy water is typically kept in a font placed in the narthex (entrance) of the church, where it is available for anyone who would like to take some of it home with them. It is customary for Orthodox to drink holy water, to use it in their cooking and to sprinkle their houses with it.

Often, when objects are blessed in the church (such as the palms on Palm Sunday, Icons or sacred vessels) the blessing is completed by a triple sprinkling with holy water using the words, "This (name of item) is blessed by the sprinkling of this holy water, in the name of the Father, and of the Son, and of the Holy Spirit."

Holy water is sometimes sprinkled on items or people when they are blessed outside the church building, as part of the prayers of blessing. In Russia, it is common for Orthodox Christians to bring newly bought cars to the church for blessing. Holy water is sprinkled inside and out, as well as under the hood. Similarly, in Alaska, the fishing boats are sprinkled with holy water at the start of the fishing season as the priest prays for the crews' safety and success. Some Catholics also have a priest bless their cars or homes with holy water as a way of invoking God's blessing and protection.

Blessings

Orthodox Christians most often bless themselves with holy water by drinking it. It is traditional to keep a quantity of it at home, and many Orthodox Christians will drink a small amount daily with their morning prayers. It may also be used for informal blessings when no clergy are present. For example, parents might bless their children with holy water before they leave the house for school or play. It is also often taken with prayer in times of distress or temptation.

There are two rites for blessing holy water: the Great Blessing of Waters which is held on the Feast of Theophany, and the Lesser Blessing of Waters which is conducted according to need during the rest of the year. Both forms are based upon the Rite of Baptism. Certain feast days call for the blessing of Holy Water as part of their liturgical observance.

The use of holy water is based on the Baptism of Jesus by John the Baptist in the River Jordan, and the Orthodox interpretation of this event. In their view, John's baptism was a baptism of repentance, and the people came to have their sins washed away by the water. Since Jesus had no sin, but was God incarnate, his baptism had the effect not of washing away Jesus' sins, but of blessing the water, making it holy—and with it all of creation, so that it may be used fully for its original created purpose to be an instrument of life.

Jesus' baptism is commemorated in the Eastern Orthodox churches at the Feast of Theophany (literally "manifestation of God") on January 6 (for those Orthodox Christians who use the Julian Calendar, January 6 falls on the Gregorian Calendar date of January 19). At the Vespers of this feast, a font of holy water is typically blessed in the church, to provide holy water for the parish's use in the coming year. The next morning, after the Divine Liturgy a procession goes from the church to a nearby river, lake or other body of water, to bless that water as well. This represents the redemption of all creation as part of humanity's salvation.

In the following weeks, the priest typically visits the homes of the members of the parish and leads prayers of blessing for their families, homes (and even pets), sprinkling them with holy water. Again, this practice is meant to visibly represent God's sanctifying work in all parts of the people's lives.

Great Blessing of Waters at Theophany

On the Great Feast of Theophany, holy water is blessed twice: at the conclusion of the Divine Liturgy on the eve of the feast, and on morning of the feast itself. After processing to the place where the vessel of water is prepared, to the singing of appropriate troparia (hymns) of the Theophany, there are a group of Scripture readings (and ), culminating in the baptism account from the Gospel of Saint Mark followed by the Great Litany. This is sung just as at the beginning of the Divine Liturgy, but with the following additional petitions which make clear what is being asked of God and what the use, purpose, and blessing of the water is believed to entail.

That these waters may be sanctified by the power, and effectual operation, and descent of the Holy Spirit, let us pray to the Lord.
That there may descend upon these waters the cleansing operation of the super-substantial Trinity, let us pray to the Lord.
That he will endue them with the grace of redemption, the blessing of Jordan, the might, and operation, and descent of the Holy Spirit, let us pray to the Lord.
That Satan may speedily be crushed under our feet, and that every evil counsel directed against us may be brought to naught, let us pray to the Lord.
That the Lord our God will free us from every attack and temptation of the enemy, and make us worthy of the good things which he hath promised, let us pray to the Lord.
That he will illumine us with the light of understanding and of piety, and with the descent of the Holy Spirit, let us pray to the Lord.
That the Lord our God will send down the blessing of Jordan, and sanctify these waters, let us pray to the Lord.
That this water may be unto the bestowing of sanctification; unto the remission of sins; unto the healing of soul and body; and unto every expedient service, let us pray to the Lord.
That this water may be a fountain welling forth unto life eternal, let us pray to the Lord.
That it may manifest itself effectual unto the averting of every machination of our foes, whether visible or invisible, let us pray to the Lord.
For those who shall draw of it and take of it unto the sanctification of their homes, let us pray to the Lord.
That it may be for the purification of the souls and bodies of all those who, with faith, shall draw and partake of it, let us pray to the Lord.
That he will graciously enable us to perfect sanctification by participation in these waters, through the invisible manifestation of the Holy Spirit, let us pray to the Lord.

Then, following a lengthy set of didactic prayers that expound on the nature of the feast and summarize salvation history, praising God's creation of and mastery over the elements, the priest makes the Sign of the Cross over the water with his hand and prays specifically for the blessing to be invoked upon it. At the climax of the service, he immerses the hand cross into the water three times in imitation of Christ's baptism to the singing of the festal troparion:

When Thou wast baptized in the Jordan, O Lord,
The worship of the Trinity was made manifest.
For the voice of the Father bore witness to Thee,
And called Thee His beloved Son.
And the Spirit, in the form of a dove,
Confirmed the truthfulness of His word.
O Christ God, Who hast revealed Thyself,
And hast enlightened the world, glory be to Thee!
In Greek: 
Εν Ιορδάνη βαπτιζομένου Σου, Κύριε,
Η της Τριάδος εφανερώθη προσκύνησις.
Του γαρ γεννήτορος η φωνή προσεμαρτύρει Σοι,
αγαπητόν Σε Υιόν ονομάζουσα.
Και το Πνεύμα εν είδει περιστεράς,
Εβεβαίου του λόγου το ασφαλές.
Ο επιφανής, Χριστέ, ο Θεός,
Και τον κόσμον φωτίσας, δοξα Σοι

The priest then blesses the entire church and congregation with the newly consecrated water. All come forward to be sprinkled over the head with the Theophany Water as they kiss the hand cross, and to drink some of it.

The priest will then set out to bless the homes of all of the faithful with Theophany Water. In large parishes, this process will take some time. However, the priest must bless all of the houses of the faithful before the beginning of Great Lent. In monasteries the Hegumen (Superior) will bless the cells of all of the monks.

Orthodox Christianity teaches that the Great Blessing of Waters actually changes the nature of the water, and that water so blessed is no longer corruptible, but remains fresh for many years. 

The Great Blessing of Waters is normally only blessed at this one time of the year; however, at the Consecration of a church, a Great Blessing of Waters will often precede the service.

Lesser Blessing of Waters

The Lesser Blessing is called "lesser" not because it is shorter (in fact, it isn't), but because it does not have the same solemnity as the Great Blessing, and does not necessarily change the nature of the water.

While much is the same, the rite begins with Psalm 142 (LXX) and the hymns to the Theophany of the Great Blessing are replaced in the Lesser Blessing with hymns to the Theotokos. The scriptural readings are different, and the special petitions at the Great Litany are different:

That these waters may be sanctified by the power, and effectual operation, and descent of the Holy Spirit, let us pray to the Lord.

That there may descend upon these waters the cleansing operation of the super-substantial Trinity, let us pray to the Lord.

That this water may be unto the healing of souls and bodies, and unto the banishing of every hostile power, let us pray to the Lord.

That the Lord our God will send down the blessing of Jordan, and sanctify these waters, let us pray to the Lord.

For all those who entreat of God's aid and protection, let us pray to the Lord.

That he will illumine us with the light of understanding, with the consubstantial Trinity, let us pray to the Lord.

That the Lord our God will show us forth sons and heirs of his kingdom, through partaking of and sprinkling with these waters, let us pray to the Lord.

Then the priest says a prayer very similar to the one used at Theophany, but when he immerses the hand cross into the water three times, instead of singing the troparion of Theophany, he sings the troparion of the Cross:
Save, O Lord, Thy people and bless Thine inheritance, granting unto the faithful victory over enemies. And by the power of Thy Cross, do Thou preserve Thy commonwealth.The Lesser Blessing of Waters may be performed according to need. It is specifically called for on August 1 (the feast of the Procession of the Cross); on Bright Friday (Friday in Easter Week) which is the feast of the Theotokos of the "Life-giving Spring"; and on the Feast of Mid-Pentecost, when all of the fields are blessed. There is also a tradition of blessing Holy Water on the first day of each month.

Though there is no special blessing said over it, the water used for the Washing of Feet on Maundy Thursday could be considered a form of holy water, in that the Bishop or Hegumen will bless the faithful with it at the end of the ceremony. Among the Coptics, this water is blessed with the cross before the Washing of Feet. The Coptics also sprinkle the faithful with holy water on Palm Sunday, and at the end of every Divine Liturgy.

See also
Holy water
Holy water font
Ablution in Christianity
Anglican devotions
Catholic devotions

References
 (Mother) Mary; Ware, (Archimandrite) Kallistos (Tr.)(1998). The Festal Menaion (reprint), pp 348–359. South Canaan: St. Tikhon's Seminary Press. .
 Isabel Florence Hapgood (Tr., Ed.)(1983). Service Book of the Holy Orthodox-Catholic Apostolic Church (6th ed.), pp 189–197. Englewood: Antiochian Orthodox Christian Archdiocese.
 Collectio Rituum ad instar appendicis Ritualis Romani pro dioecesibus Statuum Foederatorum Americae Septentrionalis. Milwaukee, Bruce (1954)

Notes

External links
 Ordo ad faciendam aquam benedictam (Latin). Pre-Vatican 2 Roman Catholic rite
 On Holy Water blessed at Theophany by St. John of Shanghai and San Francisco (Eastern Orthodox)
Photo of Great Blessing of Waters at Theophany (Russian Orthodox)
Photo of Lesser Blessing of Waters (Russian Orthodox)
St Brigid's Well, County Kildare

Baptism
Catholic liturgy
Eastern Christian liturgical objects
Liquid water
Christian religious objects
Sacramentals
Water wells
Christian processions
Ritual purity in Christianity